James Wallace Stewart (1921 – 10 June 2006), was a former professor of haematology Middlesex Hospital, London.

James Wallace Stewart became an assistant pathologist at the Bland Sutton Institute of Pathology, Middlesex Hospital, London, in 1948 after national service and was promoted to senior lecturer in 1950, reader in 1959, and professor in 1970, retiring in 1986. He was treasurer of the British Society for Haematology for its first 15 years, and a founder fellow of the Royal College of Pathologists. His laboratory was one of the first in the United Kingdom to have a Coulter counter, and he helped to develop quality assurance in haematology. From the early 1970s he innovatively treated patients with haematological disorders. He was consultant haematologist to the London Clinic well beyond his 70th year. He leaves a wife, Peggy; five children; and eight grandchildren.

1921 births
2006 deaths
English pathologists
Academics of University College London